The 1941 WANFL season was the 57th season of the various incarnations of the Western Australian National Football League. Owing to the drain of players to military service in World War II, the league was forced to suspend the reserves competition until 1946, and ultimately this was to be the last season of senior football in Perth until 1945 as the supply of available players became smaller and smaller and the Japanese military threatened northern Western Australia.

On the field, 1941 saw West Perth, boosted by veteran goal machine Ted Tyson's comeback from appendicitis and planned retirement, achieve a premiership barely two years after having lost 27 consecutive matches as a young nucleus that would make them a power after the war, including such players as Stan Heal and Bill Baker, defeated perennial powerhouse East Fremantle twice during the finals. In a thrilling struggle for the fourth position, East Perth lost out despite an impressive final-round win over the eventual premiers and missed the finals for the first time since 1930; they were despite a perfect season in the 1944 under-age competition not to return to open-age finals until 1952.

Home-and-away season

Round 1

Round 2

Round 3

Round 4

Round 5

Round 6 (Foundation Day)

Round 7

Round 8

Round 9

Round 10

Round 11

Round 12

Round 13

Round 14

Round 15

Round 16

Round 17

Round 18

Round 19

Round 20

Ladder

Finals

First semi-final

Second semi-final

Preliminary final

Grand Final

References

External links
Official WAFL website
Western Australian National Football League (WANFL), 1941

West Australian Football League seasons
WANFL